Eight ships or submarines of the Royal Navy have been named HMS Anson, after Admiral George Anson:
 , a 60-gun fourth rate launched in 1747 and sold in 1773.
 , a 6-gun cutter that was constructed by the French as L'Iroquois in 1759. The British captured the ship in 1760 and renamed her Anson.  In 1763 Anson struck a shoal off Susan Island, New York. in the Saint Lawrence River and sank.
 , a 64-gun third rate launched in 1781, cut down around 1794 to a large frigate of 44 guns and wrecked in 1807.
 , a 74-gun third-rate, used on harbour service from 1831, as a convict ship from 1844 and was broken up in 1851.
 , a 91-gun screw-propelled battleship launched in 1860, renamed Algiers in 1883 and broken up in 1904.
 , an  launched in 1886 and sold in 1909.
 , a proposed , ordered in 1916 and cancelled in 1918.
 , a  battleship launched in 1940 and broken up in 1957.
 , the fifth , launched on 20 April 2021.

Battle honours
Ships named Anson have earned the following battle honours:
The Saints, 1782
Donegal, 1798
Curacoa, 1807
Arctic, 1942−43

Note

References

 

Royal Navy ship names